Walter Curran Mendenhall (February 20, 1871 – June 2, 1957), was the fifth director of the US Geological Survey.

Life
Mendenhall was born in Marlboro, Ohio to William King Mendenhall and Emma P. Garrigues. He graduated from Ohio Normal University. He married Alice May Boutelle (born 1876); the couple had two daughters, Margaret Boutelle Mendenhall (born 1916) and Alice Curran Mendenhall (born 1918).

He was a distant relation of Thomas Corwin Mendenhall, superintendent of U.S. National Geodetic Survey.

USGS career
In December 1930, Hoover appointed George Otis Smith to the newly reorganized Federal Power Commission and then appointed Walter C. Mendenhall to succeed Smith as Director of the US Geological Survey, honoring not only a commitment to appoint the heads of scientific agencies from within the civil service but also a commitment to support basic research. Mendenhall and Smith were both 59 years old. Mendenhall had joined the Survey in 1894, fresh from Ohio Normal University, and had mapped in the Appalachian coal fields. In 1898, he had been one of the pioneer geologists in Alaska, and in 1903 he had become one of the first ground-water specialists in the Water Resources Branch. 

An early member of the Land Classification Board, he became its chairman in 1911 and in 1912 the first Chief of the Land Classification Branch. For eight years before becoming Director, Mendenhall had been the Chief Geologist. Although more than half his surveying career had been in administrative work, he had made notable contributions to the geology of Alaska, and his study of the principles in ground-water hydrology had helped to establish it as a field of scientific endeavor. King, Powell, Walcott and Mendenhall all were members of the National Academy of Sciences.

Mendenhall's directorate was pivotal in the history of the Geological Survey. In spite of the difficult times, the depression years, and the beginning of World War II, he encouraged the Survey, as he had the Geologic Branch, to emphasize the necessity of basic research and created an environment in which, in the words of the Engineering and Mining Journal, "scientific research, technical integrity, and practical skill could flourish." 

A year after Mendenhall became Director, the Federal budget was sharply cut as the effects of the depression began to be felt. The appropriations were not restored to earlier levels until the late 1930s, shortly before the outbreak of World War II, but the Survey subsisted, even grew, on funds transferred from agencies formed to combat the depression by the Franklin D. Roosevelt administration. The Tennessee Valley Authority, established in May 1933, turned to the Survey to meet its need for maps of the entire valley and for a much expanded program of stream gaging throughout the basin. 

In 1943, as the Federal Government began planning for the postwar era, Director Mendenhall, who had served 2 years beyond then mandatory retirement age by Presidential exemption, was succeeded by William Embry Wrather. Mendenhall died in Chevy Chase, Maryland, 1957.

Publications
 Mendenhall, Walter Curran, "Progress in physics in the nineteenth century" Sun Publishing, c1901.
 Mendenhall, Walter Curran, "Reconnaissance from Fort Hamlin to Kotzebue Sound Alaska" USGS Professional Paper No.10. (1902)
 Mendenhall, Walter Curran, and Schrader, F.C. "The mineral resources of the Mount Wrangell district, Alaska" USGS Professional Paper No.15, (1903)
 Mendenhall, Walter Curran, "Development of underground waters in the eastern coastal plain region of southern California" USGS Water Supply Paper No.137. (1905)
 Mendenhall, Walter Curran, "Development of underground waters in the central coastal plain region of Southern California" USGS Water Supply Paper No.138. (1905)
 Mendenhall, Walter Curran, "Development of underground waters in the western coastal-plain region of southern California" USGS Water Supply Paper No.139. (1905)
 Mendenhall, Walter Curran, "Geology of the Central Copper River region, Alaska" USGS Professional Paper No.41, (1905)
 Leighton, Morris Morgan, "Walter Curran Mendenhall (1871-1957)" AAPG Bulletin; March 1958; v. 42; no. 3; p. 682-690
 Deming, D. "Walter Curran Mendenhall: Quaker scientist" Ground Water. 2004 May-Jun;42(3):465-71.
 Mendenhall, Walter Curran, "Some desert watering places in southeastern California and southwestern Nevada" USGS Water Supply Paper No.224. (1909)
 Mendenhall, Walter Curran, "Ground waters of the Indio region, California, with a sketch of the Colorado desert" USGS Water Supply Paper No.225. (1909)

References

External links
 
 Portrait of Walter Curran Mendenhall via the US Geological Survey
 Photograph of Walter Curran Mendenhall via the US Geological Survey

1871 births
1957 deaths
People from Stark County, Ohio
Ohio Northern University alumni
United States Geological Survey personnel
American geologists
Members of the United States National Academy of Sciences
Writers from Ohio
Presidents of the Geological Society of America
Scientists from Ohio